Sayram Lake is a fresh water lake located near the border of Kazakhstan at the Tian Shan Mountains in Börtala Mongol Autonomous Prefecture, Xinjiang, China. The name Sayram originally derives from Kazakh, which means 'blessing'. The lake is also known as Santai Haizi and is the largest (458 km²) alpine lake in Xinjiang and also the highest at 2,070 m.

A local folktale relates that the lake was formed by a young Kazakh couple who had been separated by a demon, and were forced to jump into an abyss to be reunited. Their tears filled the abyss, forming the lake.

References

External links

Lakes of China
Lakes of Xinjiang
Parks in Xinjiang
Tian Shan